The whitetongue jack (Uraspis helvola) is a species of jack in the family Carangidae. It is found in all tropical and subtropical oceans worldwide.

Distribution and habitat
This species of fish is found in tropical and subtropical oceans worldwide. In the Atlantic Ocean, it is found in west Africa. In the Indian Ocean, its range is from the Red Sea, and the Persian Gulf south to eastern Africa, Madagascar, Seychelles, and Comoros. It is also found in western India, the Maldives, Sri Lanka, the Andaman Sea, western Sumatra, southern Indonesia, and western and southern Australia. In the Pacific Ocean, it is found off eastern Asia, around Hawaii, and New Zealand.

Description
This fish has 9 dorsal spines, 25 to 30 dorsal soft rays, 3 anal spines, and 19 to 22 anal soft rays.

References

External links
 

whitetongue jack
Fish of the Atlantic Ocean
Fish of the Indian Ocean
Fish of Hawaii
whitetongue jack